Juan Francisco Castillo Azdura  (born June 23, 1970) is a former Major League Baseball right-handed relief pitcher who played for the New York Mets in 1994.

Castillo compiled a career 0–0 record with 1 strikeout and a 6.94 of ERA in 11 innings.

See also
 List of players from Venezuela in Major League Baseball

External links

1970 births
Living people
Acereros de Monclova players
Águilas del Zulia players
Binghamton Mets players
Columbia Mets players
Gulf Coast Mets players
Jackson Generals (Texas League) players
Major League Baseball pitchers
Major League Baseball players from Venezuela
Mexican League baseball pitchers
Navegantes del Magallanes players
New York Mets players
Norfolk Tides players
Pittsfield Mets players
Baseball players from Caracas
St. Lucie Mets players
Tucson Toros players
Tulsa Drillers players
venezuelan expatriate baseball players in Mexico
Venezuelan expatriate baseball players in the United States